Mieris is the name of a family of artists who practised painting at Leiden for three generations in the 17th and 18th centuries.

Frans van Mieris the Elder (1635–1681)
Jan van Mieris (1660–1690), son of Frans
Willem van Mieris (1662–1747), son of Frans
Frans van Mieris the Younger (1689–1763), son of Willem